Kiddy's Corner School is an English medium, co-educational school in Gwalior, Madhya Pradesh, India. It has a campus at University Road and one near the city. The school includes the Thatipur branch, Naya Bazar branch, and Shivpuri branch. 

Facilities at the school include a hostel and a playground. The school owner is Mr. Vijay Garg and Varun Garg.  The school teaches CBSE and M.P. Board. The four houses are Red, Blue, Yellow and Green.

Schools in Gwalior